Lasjia grandis, also known as the satin silky oak or Barong nut, is a species of forest tree in the protea family that is endemic to north-eastern Queensland, Australia. Its conservation status is considered to be Vulnerable under Queensland's Nature Conservation Act 1992.

History
The tree was first described in 1993 in the journal Australian Systematic Botany by Caroline Gross and Bernard Hyland as a species of Macadamia, but was transferred in 2008 in the American Journal of Botany by Peter Weston and Austin Mast to the new genus Lasjia.

Description
The leaves are 8–23 cm long by 2–6 cm wide. The terminal buds are covered in rust-brown coloured hairs. The cream to yellow flowers grow as inflorescences with curved bracts. The globular fruits are 5–6 cm in diameter.

Distribution and habitat
The species occurs in lowland tropical rainforest in the China Camp (Bloomfield) region from near sea level to an altitude of 450 m.

References

grandis
Flora of Queensland
Endemic flora of Australia
Proteales of Australia
Taxa named by Bernard Hyland
Plants described in 1993